Marker Museum (English: Marken's Museum) is a local museum in the village of Marken in the Netherlands. The museum focuses on the history of Marken, including its fishing heritage.

The museum comprises six houses.The building is a Rijksmonument.

References

External links 
 
 

1983 establishments in the Netherlands
Fishing museums
Local museums in the Netherlands
History museums in the Netherlands
Marken
Museums established in 1983
20th-century architecture in the Netherlands